Mercedes-Benz has sold a number of automobiles with the "300" model name:
 1951–1957 W186
 1951–1957 300
 1951–1958 W188
 1951–1958 300S
 1954–1963 W198
 1954–1963 300SL
 1958–1962 W189
 1958–1962 300d
 1961–1965 W112
 1961–1965 300SE
 1962–1965 300SEL
 1965–1967 W108
 1965–1967 300SEb
 1965–1972 W109
 1965–1970 300SEL
 1968–1972 300SEL 6.3
 1969–1972 300SEL 3.5
 1971–1972 300SEL 4.5
 1975–1976 W115
 1975–1976 300D
 1977–1985 W123
 1977–1985 300D
 1978–1985 300CD
 1979–1985 300TD
 1982-1985 300D Turbodiesel 
 1982-1985 300CD Turbodiesel 
 1981-1985 300TD Turbodiesel 
 1978–1980 W116
 1978–1980 300SD Turbodiesel 
 1986–1995 W124
 1986–1993 300E
 1987 300D Turbo
 1987 300TD Turbo
 1988–1989 300CE
 1988–1993 300TE
 1990–1992 300CE-24
 1990–1993 300D 2.5 Turbo
 1990–1992 300E 2.6
 1990–1993 300E 4MATIC
 1990–1993 300TE 4MATIC
 1993 300E 2.8
 1993 300E 3.2
 1993 300CE 3.2
 1993 300TE 3.2
 1995 E300 Diesel
 1981–1991 W126
 1981–1985 300SD Turbodiesel 
 1986–1987 300SDL Turbo 
 1988–1991 300SEL
 1989–1991 300SE
 1990–1993 R129
 1990–1993 300SL-24
 1992–1993 W140
 1991–1993 300SD 3.5 Turbodiesel 
 1992–1993 300SE 3.2
 1996–1999 W210
 1996–1997 E300 Diesel
 1998–1998 E300 Turbodiesel
2008–2009 W211
2008–2009 E300 BlueTEC
2006–2013 W221
2006–2013 S300
2010–2014 W204
2011–2014 C300
2012–2014 C300 CDI
2010–2016 W212
2010–2014 E300
2010–2014 E300 CDI
2014–2016 E300 BlueTEC
2013–2016 E300 BlueTEC HYBRID
2013–2020 W222
2013–2017 S300 BlueTEC HYBRID
2014–2021 W205
2015–2021 C300
2015–2021 C300d
2019–2021 C300e
2019–2021 C300de
2016–present W213
2016–present E300
2019–present E300d
2019–present E300e
2019–present E300de
2021–present W206
2021–present C300
2021–present C300d

300